Antal Zirczy (2 February 1898 – 20 October 1972) was a Hungarian fencer. He competed in the team foil event at the 1936 Summer Olympics.

References

External links
 

1898 births
1972 deaths
Hungarian male foil fencers
Olympic fencers of Hungary
Fencers at the 1936 Summer Olympics
Martial artists from Budapest